15th Government of Slovenia (also known as the Golob Cabinet) was formed by Robert Golob following the 2022 Slovenian parliamentary election. Robert Golob, leader of the Freedom Movement, was nominated as Prime Minister, and was approved as such on 25 May. The government will have the largest number of ministries after the 1st Government of Slovenia.

Composition

Cabinet 
Here is the actual composition of the cabinet according to the official page:

Coalition

Formation and election

Candidate for prime minister 
President Borut Pahor nominated Robert Golob, leader of the Freedom Movement, to be the next prime minister after consultations with political groups' leaders in the National Assembly.

Election of the prime minister

Election of the government 
The National Assembly confirmed the cabinet ministers on 1 June 2022.

Portfolio changes 
The following portfolios were changed in the Golob cabinet:

 new Ministry of the Environment, Climate and Energy will be responsible for the environment, waste management and climate change, previously within the Ministry of the Environment and Spatial Planning,  and public transport, transport policy, sustainable mobility, energy and renewable sources, previously within the Ministry of Infrastructure;
 new Ministry of Digital Transformation, previously Office of the Government for Digital Transformation will now be transformed into a ministry, which will also be responsible for information technology in public administration;
 new Ministry of Higher Education, Science and Innovation will be responsible for higher education, science, research, previously under the Ministry of Education, Science and Sport, and technology development and innovation, previously under the Ministry of Economic Development and Technology;
 new Ministry of Solidary Future will be responsible for long-term care, previously under the Ministry of Health, housing policy, previously under the Ministry of the Environment and Spatial Planning, and economic democracy;
 new Ministry of Regional Development and Cohesion, previously the Government Office for Development and Cohesion will now be transformed into a ministry, which will also be responsible for regional development, previously under the Ministry of Economic Development and Technology;
 the Ministry of the Environment and Spatial Planning will be renamed in the Ministry of Natural Resources and Spatial Planning, now only responsible for the nature, waters, nuclear safety and spatial planning, and also mining, previously under the Ministry of Infrastructure;
 the Ministry of Economic Development and Technology will be renamed in the Ministry of Economy, Tourism and Sport and will now also be responsible for sport, previously under the Ministry of Education, Science and Sport, but will no longer be responsible for technology and innovation;
 the Ministry of Education, Science and Sport will be renamed in the Ministry of Education, now only responsible for primary and secondary education, adult education and youth;
 the Ministry of Infrastructure will now be responsible for road and other infrastructure only;
 the Ministry of Health will no longer be responsible for long-term care;
 the Ministry of Public Administration will no longer be responsible for information technology in public administration; and
 the Ministry of Foreign Affairs will be renamed in the Ministry of Foreign and European Affairs, with no changes in responsibilities.

No changes are planned for the Ministry of the Interior, Ministry of Justice, Ministry of Finance, Ministry of Defense, Ministry of Agriculture, Forestry and Food, Ministry of Labor, Family, Social Affairs and Equal Opportunities, Ministry of Culture and the Government Office for the Slovenians Abroad.

References 

Cabinets of Slovenia
Cabinets established in 2022
Politics of Slovenia
2022 establishments in Slovenia
Current governments